Channel M News was a regional television news service covering the ten boroughs of Greater Manchester, North West England produced by Channel M, partly in conjunction with the Manchester Evening News.

History
Launched in 2004, Channel M News aired each weekday evening alongside a weekly review programme and occasional documentary specials. Breakfast, lunchtime and late evening news bulletins were also produced throughout the programme's run.

Channel M News was produced and broadcast from the station's studios at Urbis and the MEN Media newsroom at Spinningfields in Manchester City Centre. The programme had previously been pre-recorded from small temporary studios in The Triangle shopping centre, The Printworks entertainment complex and Urbis before going live from a new, larger studio at Urbis in May 2006, looking out towards Cathedral Gardens and the Manchester Victoria railway station.

The final evening edition of Channel M News was broadcast on Friday 10 July 2009. From Monday 13 July 2009, the station's news coverage was incorporated into Channel M Today, a three-hour topical magazine programme on weekdays.

Mass media in Manchester
British television news shows